Fidelity is the quality of faithfulness or loyalty.

Fidelity may also refer to:

Arts and entertainment

Film and television
 Fidelity (2000 film) (La Fidélité), a French drama film
 Fidelity (2019 film), a Russian drama film
 "Fidelity", an episode of the TV series House (season 1)

Music
Fidelity, a 1996 album by The Durutti Column
"Fidelity", a composition by Joseph Haydn
 "Fidelity" (song), by Regina Spektor, 2006
 "Fidelity", a song by Starsailor from their 2003 album Silence Is Easy

Other uses in arts and entertainment
 Fidelity (art and symbolism), a personification in Western art of the secular aspect of faith, or trust
 Fidelity (novel), by Susan Glaspell, 1915

Businesses and organisations
 Fidelity Investments, commonly referred to as Fidelity, a multinational financial services corporation 
 Fidelity International, an investment management company, spun off from Fidelity Investments
 Fidelity and Deposit Company, an American trust company
 Fidelity Bank Ghana, a commercial bank
 Fidelity Bank Nigeria, or Fidelity Bank Plc, a commercial bank
 Fidelity Commercial Bank Limited, now SBM Bank Kenya Limited
 Fidelity Communications, an American telecommunications company 
 Fidelity National Financial, an American mortgage company
 Fidelity National Information Services, or FIS, an American financial services company
 Fidelity Printers and Refinery, a Zimbabwean security printing and gold refinery company
 Fidelity Records, an American record label
 Fidelity Southern Corporation, an American financial holding company 
 Fidelity Trust Company, a former American bank

Places
 Fidelity, Illinois, U.S.
 Fidelity Township, Jersey County, Illinois, U.S.
 Fidelity, Missouri, U.S.

Ships
 , a Royal Navy Special Service Vessel lost in the Second World War
 , more than one ship of the U.S. Navy

Other uses
 Fidelity of quantum states, in quantum information theory
 WFID Fidelity, a radio station in Puerto Rico
 Fidelity (Anglican), a defunct organization in the Anglican Church of Canada

See also

 Fidelity Building (disambiguation)
 High fidelity (disambiguation)
 Lo-fi (disambiguation)
 Infidelity (disambiguation)
 Fidelity bond, a form of insurance protection
 "Fidelity Fiduciary Bank", a song from Walt Disney's film Mary Poppins
 Fidelity Medallion, a decoration of the U.S. military
 The Fidelity Ultimate Chess Challenge, a 1991 chess video game